The 644th Regional Support Group (644th RSG) is a subordinate command of 103rd Sustainment Command (Expeditionary). The 644th RSG was formerly called the 644th Area Support Group. under the 88th Regional Support Group prior to being transferred to the 103rd ESC. It controls a Transportation battalion within Minnesota and Iowa.

Units
The brigade is made up of the following units:
 457th Transportation Battalion
 457th Headquarters and Headquarters Battalion (Motor) 
 189th Transportation Detachment (Trailer Transfer Platoon) 
 203rd Transportation Company (Cargo Transfer) 
 322nd Transportation Company (Support Maintenance) 
 353rd Transportation Company (Medium Truck)
 825th Transportation Detachment (Tactical Water Distribution) 
 847th Transportation Company (Personnel) (Human Resources) 
 960th Transportation Company (Petrol Support)

Operation Enduring Freedom
A detachment of Soldiers from 644th RSG mobilized to Joint Base McGuire-Dix-Lakehurst as part of TF Scorpion and deployed to Afghanistan as part of NATO Training Mission-Afghanistan.

References

External links
  The Institute Of Heraldry
 Fort Snelling Army Reserve Group Heading Overseas
 Fort Snelling Army Reserve Group Heading Overseas
 Minnesota Soldiers Heading to Afghanistan
 Fort Snelling Army Reserve group headed overseas

Military units and formations of the United States Army Reserve
Support groups of the United States Army